Television Wan is Papua New Guinea's newest digital free-to-view TV network with nationwide coverage. It is fully funded and owned by Digicel PNG on their new platform Digicel Play.

It was launched on 14 November 2014.

In April 2016, When Digicel acquired Sky Pacific, TVWan was added as one of the 2 new stations alongside TVWan Sports.

Apart from TVWan, it also runs 4 other channels on Digicel Play, TVWan Sports, TVWan Action, TVWan Life and TVWan Rugby.

External links

References

Television stations in Papua New Guinea
Television channels and stations established in 2014
Mass media in Papua New Guinea
Digicel